Coloma is a city in Berrien County in the U.S. state of Michigan. The population was 1,483 at the 2010 census.

History
Coloma was first known as Shingle Diggins because of the wood shingles that were manufactured in the area. The community was renamed Dickerville because people in the town had to barter and dicker for items after the timber supply was exhausted.
 
The name Coloma was later suggested by Stephen R. Gilson, after a town in California he had visited during the Gold Rush era.

It was incorporated as a village in 1893 and as a city in 1941.

Geography

Rich farmland in the area made temperate by Lake Michigan is called the Fruit Belt, and Coloma is located in the Lake Michigan Shore American Viticultural Area.

Coloma is near the former resort area of Paw Paw Lake.

Demographics

2010 census
As of the census of 2010, there were 1,483 people, 606 households, and 398 families living in the city. The racial makeup of the city was 93.5% White, 1.2% African American, 0.5% Native American, 1.1% Asian, 1.7% from other races, and 2.1% from two or more races. Hispanic or Latino of any race were 3.9% of the population.

There were 606 households, of which 32.2% had children under the age of 18 living with them, 44.7% were married couples living together, 14.7% had a female householder with no husband present, 6.3% had a male householder with no wife present, and 34.3% were non-families. 28.7% of all households were made up of individuals, and 8.8% had someone living alone who was 65 years of age or older. The average household size was 2.44 and the average family size was 3.00.

The median age in the city was 38.6 years. 24.6% of residents were under the age of 18; 8.7% were between the ages of 18 and 24; 25.1% were from 25 to 44; 27% were from 45 to 64; and 14.5% were 65 years of age or older. The gender makeup of the city was 48.9% male and 51.1% female.

2000 census
As of the census of 2000, there were 1,595 people, 626 households, and 446 families living in the city. The racial makeup of the city was 96.61% White, 1.13% African American, 0.38% Native American, 0.31% Asian, 0.25% from other races, and 1.32% from two or more races. Hispanic or Latino of any race were 1.32% of the population.

There were 626 households, out of which 35.3% had children under the age of 18 living with them, 54.2% were married couples living together, 13.7% had a female householder with no husband present, and 28.6% were non-families. 24.8% of all households were made up of individuals, and 12.9% had someone living alone who was 65 years of age or older.  The average household size was 2.55 and the average family size was 3.03.

In the city, the population was spread out, with 28.2% under the age of 18, 6.0% from 18 to 24, 29.0% from 25 to 44, 22.7% from 45 to 64, and 14.1% who were 65 years of age or older.  The median age was 37 years. For every 100 females, there were 89.2 males.  For every 100 females age 18 and over, there were 83.2 males.

The median income for a household in the city was $38,882, and the median income for a family was $46,042. Males had a median income of $36,681 versus $21,397 for females. The per capita income for the city was $17,714.  About 5.9% of families and 8.9% of the population were below the poverty line, including 7.2% of those under age 18 and 8.6% of those age 65 or over.

Arts and culture
The Glad-Peach Festival is held in Coloma every August.

Infrastructure

Major highways

References

External links

 City of Coloma Homepage

Cities in Berrien County, Michigan
1893 establishments in Michigan